Harry Sheridan is an Irish rugby union player who plays lock and flanker for Ulster Rugby.

Born in Holywood, County Down, he attended Sullivan Upper School, where he initially played prop, before converting to lock. He was the school's leading scorer in 2020. He missed out on a place in the Ulster academy when he left school, instead going to Trinity College Dublin to study Management Science and Information Systems. He played rugby for Dublin University in the All-Ireland League, and stayed in touch with Ulster academy coach Kieran Campbell, including sending him videos of his performances.

During the COVID-19 pandemic, he studied online from home, meaning he could train with the Ulster sub-academy. He was selected for Ulster 'A' against Leinster 'A' in January 2021, the first time he had played blindside flanker, and trained with the Ulster senior team. He played all but five minutes of the 2021 under-20 Six Nations Championship for Ireland. He joined the Ulster academy ahead of the 2021–22 season.

For the 2022–23 academic year he received a Trevor West Scholarship for exceptional contribution to sport at Trinity College. He made his senior Ulster debut off the bench in January 2023 in the Champions Cup against La Rochelle, replacing Iain Henderson, before making his first start at home against Sale Sharks. He scored his first Ulster try in a URC defeat to Glasgow Warriors in February 2023.

He has a black belt in Taekwondo.

References

External links

Harry Sheridan at AllRugby

2001 births
Living people
People from Holywood, County Down
People educated at Sullivan Upper School
Alumni of Trinity College Dublin
Irish rugby union players
Ulster Rugby players
Rugby union locks
Rugby union flankers